The Hyundai Accent, or Hyundai Verna (현대 베르나) is a subcompact car produced by Hyundai. In Australia, the first generation models carried over the Hyundai Excel name used by the Accent's predecessor. The Accent was replaced in 2000 by the Hyundai Verna in South Korea, although most international markets, including the US, retained the "Accent" name. The "Accent" name is an abbreviation of Advanced Compact Car of Epoch-making New Technology.

The Accent is produced for the Chinese market by Beijing Hyundai Co., a joint venture with Beijing Automotive Industry Corp. For the Russian market it was assembled by the TagAZ plant in Taganrog until 2011, and since 2011 it was assembled by the HMMR plant in Saint Petersburg and sold under the new name Hyundai Solaris. In Mexico, the Accent was marketed until 2014 by Chrysler as the Dodge Attitude, previously known as the Verna by Dodge. In Venezuela, Chrysler marketed these models as the Dodge Brisa until 2006. The Brisa was assembled by Mitsubishi Motors at its plant in Barcelona, Venezuela. Since 2002, the Accent had been the longest-running small family car sold in North America. In Puerto Rico, it was sold as the Hyundai Brio.

In 2008, Hyundai Accent was named the most dependable subcompact car by J.D. Power and Associates.



First generation (X3; 1994) 

The Hyundai Accent (X3) was introduced as a replacement for the Excel in 1994 for the 1995 model year. It continued to be called Dodge Brisa in Venezuela or Hyundai Excel in some markets, such as the Netherlands, Belgium, Indonesia and Australia. In France, it was called the Hyundai Pony, in Indonesia, the pre-facelift model was called as Bimantara Cakra and in China, it was called the Kia Qianlima.

Markets

Australia
Australian cars were released in November 1994 available in Sprint and GX trims (three-door liftback) or LX and GLX trims (four-door sedan and five-door liftback). The upper-specification models (GX and GLX) had full cloth interior (as opposed to vinyl seat backings), height and lumbar support adjustments on the driver's seat, four-speaker sound system (instead of two), passenger vanity mirror, a tachometer, and power antenna as standard. GX three-doors also had a standard rear spoiler, while power steering was standard on all but the Sprint. There were also some special editions—the Classique sedan in 1995 and 1996 with anti-lock brakes and the Sportz in 1999 and 2000 with alloy wheels and a rear spoiler. The overwhelming majority sold were the Sprint three-door, enticing buyers with free air-conditioning, driveaway pricing and from late 1998, standard power steering.

The facelift arrived in Australia in April 1997 with accompanying trim changes. A double overhead cam (DOHC) engine was also available in America in the Accent GT but made a more-powerful  at 6000 rpm instead. X3s with the DOHC engine are badged "Twin Cam".

In Australia, the X3 proved so popular (due to its reliability and low price) that it was the third best-selling vehicle in the country in both 1996 and 1998. In the latter year, it achieved more than 44,000 sales (a 5.5% share of the total market), a record figure at the time, for an imported car. Between 1994 and 2000, some 200,000 X3s were sold in Australia, making it arguably the most successful imported vehicle in the country's history.

Romania
In 1998, Hyundai created a joint venture with Romanian manufacturer Dacia to produce the Accent in Romania, at Dacia's Mioveni plant. Unfortunately, the deal failed and Dacia was bought by Renault.

United Kingdom 
The Accent was sold in saloon (sedan), liftback, and coupé form in the UK, with a choice of three engines for each: a 1.3 12v (85

 hp), 1.5 12v (92 hp) and a 1.5 16v (105 hp) petrol. There was no diesel option. A GSi spec car was the top-specification Accent. The MVi-spec coupé version won particular praise for its handling agility in the UK. Although the Accent was cheap to buy and insure, its engines were quite thirsty; the 1.5-litre returned  average according to list figures.

United States 
In the US, although manuals exist for Accents before and after 1999, a manual for 1999 Hyundai Accent has not been published. Only the 3-door Liftback and 4-door sedan were offered.

Indonesia
In Indonesia, the Accent was assembled locally and marketed as the Bimantara Cakra from 1996 to 1998(alongside the Bimantara Nenggala/Hyundai Elantra) and only available as 4-door sedan with a fuel injected 1.5-liter 12-valve engine and 5-speed manual transmission. After the 1997 Asian financial crisis that affected Indonesia in 1998, Bimantara went bankrupt and the production facilities was taken over by Hyundai (also the first time Hyundai started selling their cars with their own brand in Indonesia) and reintroduced the Cakra as Accent, still with the 1.5-liter 12-valve engine but with the facelifted model and additional 4-speed automatic transmission variant from 1998 to 2001. From 2001 to 2006, this generation was still on sale side by side with the second generation Accent (sold as Hyundai Verna) but as Hyundai Excel, specially for taxi fleets.

China
In China, the Hyundai Excel was branded as the Kia Qianlima under Dongfeng Yueda Kia. It came with either a 1.3-liter SOHC engine or a 1.6-liter engine DOHC engine. Production ran from December 2002 until November 2006. It had similar styling to the regular Hyundai Excel until it was given a facelift in 2005 featuring a new grille and foglamps. Trim levels included the 1.3 DLX, 1.3L GL (Manual), 1.3L GL (Automatic), 1.6 GLS (Manual) and the 1.6 GLS (Automatic). The only body style available was the 4-door sedan.

Safety 
The 1998 Hyundai Accent was crash-tested by the European New Car Assessment Programme and showed rather poor performance, scoring only 4 points out of 16 for frontal impact, and receiving 2 stars for adult occupants and 2 stars for pedestrians. The passenger compartment became unstable in the crash test. It was determined that there was an unacceptably high risk of chest injury during side impact crash, as a result, the car would not meet the minimum legal requirement in 1999. The Swedish insurance company, Folksam, rates the 1st-gen Accent as one of the safest cars in its weight class.

Second generation (LC; 1999) 

The redesigned 1999 Accent (LC) sported a more angular body and increased dimensions. It received a minor facelift in 2003, and was given the model code LC2. When the Accent sedan underwent a 2006 redesign, the liftback continued on sale during 2006 only in Canada, since the liftback skipped the 2006 model year for the United States. But for Korea, it was the first model with the new nameplate: Verna.

The Accent got revised 1.3 and 1.5-litre engines, featuring various improvements to lower noise, vibration, and harshness. A 1.6-litre DOHC 16-valve replaced the 1.5-litre from 2001, with the 1.5 continuing to be available in some markets. This Accent was also the first to get a diesel version, with a 1.5-litre three-cylinder direct injection turbodiesel, which was badged CRDi.

Trim levels were GSi, CDX and MVi: this was standard on most export versions, although some European markets had their own designations with names like Dynamic=Version etc. Some markets used LS and GLS.

Markets 
North America
In North America, the Accent was available in GL, GLS and GT trim levels only, with the 1.5-litre engine at first, then the 1.6-litre engine from 2002. The GT version was similar to the MVi version marketed in Europe and Oceania, although the body kit was not as overtly hot hatch styled.

During 2003 in Canada, the liftback was offered as a GS or GSi with a 1.5 L or 1.6 L engine, respectively. In 2004 the GS trim was equipped with the 1.6 L engine.

Russia 
It was sold in Russia until 2011 as the Hyundai Accent side-by-side with the 3rd generation model which was sold as the Hyundai Verna.

India
It was launched in India in October 1999 as the "Accent" and was still in production after some minor facelifts; the car was phased out in 2013 for local market. It has been restyled twice – in 2004 and 2010 – and is mated with a 1.5-liter four-cylinder petrol engine matched to a five-speed manual gearbox.

Egypt
In Egypt, it still remains on sale as of January 2019.

 Indonesia
In Indonesia, it was sold from 2001 to 2012 and marketed in 3 different names. At first it was marketed in a 4-door body style as "Accent Verna" (2001-2007), available with three trim levels, G, GL and GLS. In 2005, a facelifted version based from G trim was sold for taxi fleet as "Excel II". Later from 2007, both Accent Verna and Excel II 4-door sedan was replaced with a 5-door liftback body style, sold as "Avega" until 2012.

Engines 
 1.3 L 12-valve SOHC Alpha I4,  from 2000–2003,  from 2003–2005 (except cars with Air conditioning, rated at 82 hp).
 1.5 L 12-valve SOHC Alpha I4,  @5500 rpm and  @2900 rpm, 0–100 km/h: 12.0 sec., top speed: 
 1.5 L 16-valve DOHC Alpha I4,  and 
 0–100 km/h: 11.6 sec., top speed: 
 1.6 L 16-valve DOHC Alpha I4,  and 
 0–100 km/h: 10.9 sec., top speed: 
 1.5 L CRDi (R 315) I3,  and 
 0–100 km/h: 14.0 sec., top speed:

Safety 
A pre-2003 model (a three-door liftback) was crash tested by Australian Australasian New Car Assessment Program (ANCAP) under the rules as adopted by Euro NCAP. It scored 10.76 out of 16 points for frontal offset impact and 10.96 out of 16 in the side impact test.

The same un-restyled model, a four-door sedan had been crash tested by Russian magazine Autoreview in 2005. Test was carried out to the Euro NCAP regulations. Despite the lack of airbags (which are not available in the cheapest version of Accent on the Russian market) it scored 9.9 of 16 for frontal impact.

The 2003 restyled model was tested by ANCAP as well. The three-door liftback scored 9.19 of 16 points for frontal impact and 9.76 out of 16 in the side impact crash test.

Third generation (MC; 2005) 

Hyundai introduced a new-generation Accent (MC) at the 2005 New York International Auto Show. A new exterior, larger interior, and CVVT engine are the notable features.

A single trim level, GLS, was available in the US for the sedan. Hyundai began selling the 3-door hatchback in the United States during the spring 2006 as a 2007 model year vehicle. The 3-door was available in two trims – GS and SE. In 2010, Forbes named the Accent amongst the ten worst cars for depreciation.

In Europe, this model was heavily promoted by the motoring press, and even Hyundai themselves, as a "stopgap" model – that it was intended merely to plug the gap in Hyundai's range until a brand new small family car was launched in 2007. The new car, the Hyundai i30, replaced both the Accent and the larger Hyundai Elantra. The name change helped to distance the new model from the budget reputation of the Accent, and also to highlight that the new car can truly compete in the small family hatchback sector – something the Accent was slightly too small to do, and the Elantra too large. The Accent continued to be sold in the U.S. in 2008 with an instrument panel overhaul and standard rear cupholders in the SE model.

Engines:
 1.4 L Alpha I4,  and 
 1.6 L CVVT Alpha II I4,  and 

In Mexico, it was marketed as the Dodge Attitude: trim levels are 1.4 GL and 1.6 GLS. Hyundai had no official representation in Mexico, so select Hyundai models were rebranded as Dodges under an agreement with Chrysler's Mexican division.

In India, it was marketed as Hyundai Verna. The previous generation remains in production alongside as a cheaper alternative, marketed as the Hyundai Accent.

In Egypt, this generation was sold as the Hyundai New Accent (1.6 GLS only), and the previous model was still locally produced and sold as the Hyundai Verna (1.6 GL and GLS trims)

A number of units saw action in the taxi industry because of its fuel efficiency coupled with cheaper diesel fuel costs.

In 2008, Hyundai Accent received the lowest number of problems per 100 vehicles among compact multi-activity vehicles in the proprietary J.D. Power and Associates 2008 Vehicle Dependability Study. Study based on responses from over 52,000 original owners of 2005 model-year vehicles, measuring more than 250 models. Proprietary study results are based on experiences and perceptions of owners surveyed in January to April 2008.

Safety 
In 2006, according to the Insurance Institute for Highway Safety, the Accent received an Acceptable overall score in the frontal crash test and a Poor overall score for in the side impact test without its optional side airbags. It didn't perform well even when equipped with side airbags, performance of the car's structure is marginal there would likely be injuries to internal organs, ribs and pelvis.
In 2007, 2006 year model of Hyundai Accent had been tested by ANCAP in June 2007. It scored 3 star in the Occupant Protection, and 2 star in Pedestrian Protection Rating.

Insurance Institute for Highway Safety (IIHS) was safety tested by IIHS in 2009

Gallery

Hybrid 
Hyundai debuted a demonstration version of a hybrid (MC/JB) Accent at the 2005 Guangzhou International Automobile Exhibition in Guangzhou, China. It uses a 90 hp (67 kW), 1.4 L engine with continuously variable valve timing and a 16 hp (11.9 kW) electric motor to achieve 44% better fuel economy. Though originally scheduled for production release in the 2006 model year, introduction of the production version has been delayed indefinitely, along with the Kia Rio hybrid.

Fourth generation (RB/RC; 2010)  

Hyundai held the world-premiere of the fourth generation Accent as the Verna at the 2010 Beijing Auto Show.

Markets

South Korea 
Hyundai released the Korean version of the Accent (RB series) in November 2010. The model was offered with the same 1.6-liter engine and 6-speed automatic or 6-speed manual as the fifth-generation (MD) Elantra. The car reverted to the "Accent" name as used in the X3 series. The hatchback version, called Accent WIT, replaces the Getz/Click in South Korea. Sedan model was discontinued since in late 2018; the hatchback model was in August 2018. It was sold until Hyundai Venue launched in July 2019.

North America 
In January 2011, the sedan had its North American debut and the hatchback had its world debut at the Montreal Auto Show.

This engine features the gas direct injection technology (1.6 "GDI"). Also, the head and block are made of aluminum.

Australia 
Australia's Accent was released in August 2011 in three grades consisting of Active, Elite, and Premium in either Sedan or Hatch. All were equipped with a 1.6-litre MPi engine mated to a 5-speed manual or 4-speed automatic, while a 1.6-litre diesel was later added to the Active grade, but dropped shortly after. In 2013, an SR grade was added to replace the Elite and Premium grades and brought in the Gamma 1.6-litre GDi engine to the range. The Active had switched to a 1.4-litre engine and optional CVT to keep costs down due to the discontinuation of the i20 in Australia.

As part of a 2017 upgrade, Hyundai simplified the Accent to just one grade called Sport. The Sport grade combined the SR's 1.6-litre engine, Premium interior materials, mesh-look grille, cruise control, optional 6-speed automatic, and 16" alloy wheels while staying close to the Active's entry price.

As of January 2020, the Accent was removed from the Hyundai Australia website, marking the end of the nameplate's 20 year run with sales reaching a total of 9,963 registered units in its last year on sale.

Russia 
In September 2010, Hyundai unveiled its Russian assembly line and presented the Hyundai Solaris, a production-ready local version of the four-door fourth generation Accent. Production commenced in January 2011. For the Russian market, the Accent badge remained reserved for the second generation Accent that had still been produced in Taganrog in the TagAZ plant at that time, while export models are badged as the Accent. The Hyundai Solaris was available with 1.4-litre Gamma (107 hp) and 1.6-litre Gamma (123 hp) petrol engines, with a 6-speed manual or a 4-speed automatic transmission.

In 2014, the Solaris was facelifted. The car got new front fascia and new 6-speed automatic and 6-speed manual gearboxes for 1.6 version.

India 
In May 2011, Hyundai launched the Verna with four engine options including 1.4-litre petrol and diesel engines as well as 1.6-litre petrol and diesel engines. The second-generation model (LC) continues to be sold in India as the Accent with the latest RB version carrying the Verna brand. At the time of launch, the new Verna RB features safety and comfort options that were previously unavailable in the Indian market at this price point including the option of 6 airbags. Hyundai refreshed the Indian lineup of Verna in 2014 without any engine changes.

The Verna was offered with four engine options, 1.4 L VTVT petrol, 1.6 L VTVT petrol, 1.4 L CRDi diesel, and 1.6 L CRDi diesel.

Hyundai launched the Verna facelift in the Indian car market on 18 February 2015. The new Verna mid-sized sedan gets changes to both styling and mechanism. The updated Hyundai Verna gets new front fascia. Apart from the same petrol and diesel engine versions, the four-speed automatic gearbox is likely to be offered in the upcoming model; however, the maker might also introduce the six-speed automatic gearbox.

In 2018, the Hyundai Verna was named Indian Car Of The Year.

Indonesia 
In Indonesia, the Accent hatchback was sold as the Grand Avega, which made its debut at the 2011 Indonesia International Motor Show and was assembled locally (CKD). The Grand Avega is equipped with two engines and four transmissions: a 1.4-litre Gamma petrol engine producing  with 4-speed automatic or 5-speed manual (2011–2013) and a 1.4 L petrol 100 PS Kappa engine with 6-speed manual or CVT (2013–2016). Sedan body style also available in Indonesia only for taxi fleet and sold as Excel III, only available with 1.4 L petrol 108 PS Gamma engine and 5-speed manual transmission. In 2016, Grand Avega was replaced by the smaller Hyundai i20.

Mexico 

In Mexico, it was marketed as Dodge Attitude from 2011 until May 2014 after Hyundai's arrival in the country, forcing Dodge to give the name Attitude to the Mitsubishi Attrage. The Accent returned to the country in mid-2017 as the 2018 Hyundai Accent.

Philippines 
In the Philippines, the RB model was launched in 2011. The sedan version was powered by a  Gamma engine with a choice of a 4-speed automatic or 5-speed manual transmission. Some of first batch of RB models were dogged by knocking issues when using 91 and below octane fuel.

The hatchback model was introduced at 2013 exclusively with a 1.6 D4FB common rail direct injection turbodiesel with VGT. Both the 6-speed manual and 4-speed Automatic models came with anti-lock braking systems (ABS) with electronic brake distribution. By 2014, a facelifted model was introduced with the top-end model getting new projector-type headlamps, ABS and EBD.

In 2015, the diesel variant was upgraded on both sedan and hatchback models with an electronic VGT (e-VGT),  mated to a 6-speed manual or a new 7-speed dual-clutch automatic transmission (DCT).

China 
In Beijing, China, Hyundai released the China-exclusive version of this model under the "Verna" name on 23 August 2010 under the model code RC.

Safety 
The 2012 Hyundai Accent was tested by the IIHS and received a "Good" rating in the frontal offset test, an "Acceptable" rating in the side impact test, and a "Good" rating in the roof strength test. It also received a "Good" rating in the rear crash protection (head restraint) test.

The 2012 Hyundai Accent was tested by the U.S. National Highway Traffic Safety Administration (NHTSA) and received the following:
 Overall Rating: 
 Frontal Crash: 
 Side Crash: *
 Rollover: 

The Hyundai Verna was crash-tested by China NCAP in 2011 and scored the maximum possible 5 stars.

Insurance Institute for Highway Safety (IIHS) was safety tested by IIHS in 2012

Fifth generation (HC/YC; 2017) 

The fifth-generation Accent has been introduced in China as Verna in late 2016. Production began in the same year with sales started around February 2017. In Russia, where it is known as Solaris as well as in some other CIS markets, the car has been available since March 2017. In India, the car was launched in August 2017 as Verna. It went on sale in the United States in December 2017. Like the fourth-generation model, sedan and hatchback body styles are available, with the latter only available in Canada, Mexico and China.

Unlike the previous generations, the fifth-generation Accent is not sold in South Korea due to falling demand; instead the Venue crossover takes its place in 2019. Without supply from South Korea, the Accent was also phased out in Australia, leaving the entry model role to the Venue.

Markets

North America
The hatchback version of the fifth-generation Accent is not available in the United States market due to poor sales for its predecessor, while sedan version continued to be offered. The hatchback version was available alongside the sedan in Mexico and Canada only.

The base SE features a six-speed manual transmission, while a six-speed automatic transmission was optional. The six-speed automatic transmission is standard on the SEL and Limited models.

Features available for the first time on the Accent include forward collision avoidance alert, a touch-screen infotainment system with optional Apple CarPlay, Android Auto, and Hyundai Blue Link, proximity key entry with push-button start, seventeen-inch aluminum-alloy wheels, heated dual front bucket seats, and more.

The Accent was discontinued in Canada in the end of 2020 and was indirectly replaced by the Kona and Venue crossovers, after axing only the sedan model in 2019.  The Accent sedan remained available in the United States, while both the sedan and hatchback remained available in Mexico until its discontinuation.

For 2022, the six-speed manual transmission, only offered in the base SE trim level, was discontinued in the United States.

In June 2022, Hyundai announced that the Accent would be discontinued for the 2023 model year, with its status as the entry-level Hyundai being filled by the Venue, whereas the Mexican market will receive the HB20 instead.

India 

Codenamed HCi, the Indian-market version was launched in August 2017 as the Verna. Hyundai stated the new Verna is underpinned by the K2 platform that is more rigid than the previous-gen model’s platform, citing improvements in NVH levels, crashworthiness and overall stiffness. At launch, the Indian-market Verna was available with the 1.6-litre petrol and diesel engines carried from the previous generation and in four variants. Some of the main features includes 6 airbags, sunroof, handsfree trunk and front ventilated seats.

Both are now mated to 6-speed manual transmissions with an optional 6-speed automatic transmission.

The Bharat Stage 6-compliant facelifted model was released in March 2020. The Verna features cosmetic changes which include a refreshed front end, new LED headlamps, new rear bumper, revamped LED taillamps, and new dashboard design. Engine options were totally revamped, introducing three new engines. The 1.0-litre Kappa II turbo petrol churns out  and  output, paired to a 7-speed DCT.

The HCi Accent/Verna is exported throughout Middle East, Africa, and to the Philippines and Vietnam in knock-down kits. In November 2020, the Verna was released in Chile as the new Accent. Two months later it was released in Peru with the same name, since the original fifth-generation model was not sold in these countries, keeping the previous generation until 2020.

Russia 

In late 2017, Hyundai Motor Manufacturing plant in Saint Petersburg started assembling the fifth-generation Solaris.

In 2020, the restyled version of the Solaris was released, featuring a new front design, some additional comfort features and new touchscreen multimedia system. Engines and transmission options remained the same.

China (YC) 
The Verna was revealed as a concept version at the 2016 Chengdu Auto Show. It was sold from October 2016, with two body styles available which are 4-door sedan and 5-door hatchback, marketed as the Verna RV. The Chinese-market Verna was given a facelift in 2020.

Powertrain

Safety

Latin NCAP
The Accent in its most basic Latin American configuration with no airbags, no ABS and no ESC received 0 stars for adult occupants and 1 star for toddlers from Latin NCAP in 2018.

The Accent in its most basic Latin American configuration with 1 airbag, driver load limiter, and no ESC received 0 stars from Latin NCAP in 2021 (one level above 2018, similar to Euro NCAP 2014).

IIHS

2019
Insurance Institute for Highway Safety (IIHS) was safety tested by IIHS in 2018 and its top trim received a Top Safety Pick award:

2022
The 2022 Accent was tested by the IIHS:

Sixth generation (BN7; 2023) 

On 13 February 2023, Hyundai released teasers and information about the sixth-generation Verna that will be launched in India on 21 March 2023.

Motorsport

WRC 
Hyundai's Accent World Rally Car, Accent WRC, competed in an official capacity, spawning three generations, in the World Rally Championship from 2000 to 2003.

Junior Formula series 
In India, Hyundai was the sole engine supplier for Formula LGB Hyundai, built by the Chain and Sprocket giant LGB. The single make series is promoted at grassroots level acting as a launch pad for future Formula One hopefuls. The Accent engine is supplied in Stock form albeit after some engine control unit modifications.

X3 Excel in Australia 
In Australia, the X3 Accent is sold as the Hyundai Excel and is used in the Excel Rally Series, beginning in 2005. There are restrictions on modifications to the vehicle to reduce cost and encourage competition.

Similarly in 2010, a circuit racing competition began in Queensland called Excel Cup and soon after in South Australia called Circuit Excels. The class has since spread to all six states with several hundred race cars built nationally. A single event nationals has been created to bring all six states together for a single race meeting annually. They are the cheapest racing class in Australia based on a production road car.

Sales

References

External links 

 (sedan)
 (hatchback)

Accent
Cars introduced in 1994
Cars of Turkey
2000s cars
2010s cars
2020s cars
Subcompact cars
ANCAP small family cars
C-NCAP small family cars
Euro NCAP small family cars
Latin NCAP small family cars
Sedans
Hatchbacks
Front-wheel-drive vehicles
Vehicles with CVT transmission